Wyoming Highway 432 (WYO 432) is a  Wyoming state road in Washakie County. WYO 432 is locally known as South Flat Road for the Census-designated place (CDP) of the same name that it passes through.

Route description
Wyoming Highway 432 begins at US 20/WYO 789 and the eastern terminus of Wyoming Highway 431 approximately 8 miles southwest of Worland. Highway 432 heads east, crossing the Bighorn River before entering the CDP of South Flats from the west. Here WYO 432 turns north, and will follow the east bank of the Bighorn River north to Worland. Upon reaching the city limits of Worland, Highway 432 abruptly ends as Railway Avenue continues north into the city. US 20/WYO 789, which lies just under a mile north of here, can be reached via Railway Avenue, Culbertson Avenue and S. 5th Street. Signs stating "TO WYO 432" are posted on US 20/WYO 789 (Bighorn Avenue) and southbound along Culbertson Avenue and S. Railway Avenue.

Major intersections

References

External links 

Wyoming State Routes 400-499
WYO 432 - US-20/WYO 789/WYO 431 to Worland City Limits

Transportation in Washakie County, Wyoming
432